Cercosporin is a red toxin created by the fungal genus Cercospora. Cercospora act as pathogens on a variety of plants including corn, tobacco, soybean, and coffee. Cercosporin is a perylenequinone natural product that is photoactivated and uses reactive oxygen species (ROS) to damage cell components (membranes, proteins, lipids, etc).

Biosynthesis 
Light is required for biosynthesis and activation of cercosporin, and it has been demonstrated that light, temperature, and culture medium are regulating factors in the production of cercosporin.

Cercosporin is biosynthesized via polyketide synthases, and there are several genes that have been found responsible in the creation of the natural product.  Overall, there are 8 CTB enzymes (CTB1-8) that contribute to the production of cercosporin. CTB1 (cercosporin toxin biosynthesis) is a non-reducing PKS consisting of a KS, AT, TE/CYC and 2 ACP domains that are vital in the initiation of the creation of cercosporin. The other CTB enzymes are not as well studied, but play important roles in the biosynthesis. CTB2 acts as a methyl transferase, CTB3 also functions as a methyl transferase but also functions as a FAD-dependent monoxygenase, CTB4 is a MFS transporter, CTB5 is a FAD-dependent oxidoreductase, CTB6 is a NADPH-dependent ketone reductase, CTB7 is another FAD-dependent monoxygenase, and CTB8 is a transcription factor that regulates expression of the cluster. Figure 1 shows a general depiction of the proposed biosynthesis. As a result of the two hydroxypropyl substituents and the two oxygen substituents of the acetal linker, the perylene core twists out of planarity. The natural product occurs as a single atropisomer.

Plant defense and susceptibility 
To combat the onset of disease caused by Cercospora fungi, it has been proven that growing plants in lower light intensities can reduce the amount and severity of lesions caused by cercosporin. Some plant species use chitinases as a general defense mechanism to stop fungal infections. It has been observed that cercosporin-producing fungi that contain the Avr4 gene produce an effector that acts as a chitin-binding protein, allowing the fungi to be more virulent.

References 

Heterocyclic compounds with 6 rings
Oxygen heterocycles
Dioxepines
Toxins
Methoxy compounds
Alcohols